Oscar is an unincorporated community within Jackson Township in Texas County, in the U.S. state of Missouri. The community is located on Missouri Route 137, approximately 5.5 miles south of Licking.

History
A post office called Oscar was established in 1880, and remained in operation until 1915. The community has the name of Oscar Bradford, the son of an early settler.

References

Unincorporated communities in Texas County, Missouri
Unincorporated communities in Missouri